Sarpourenx (Béarnese: Sarporens) is a commune in the Pyrénées-Atlantiques department in south-western France, notable for once having forbidden death by mayoral decree. The demonym is Sarpourenois.

History
Never a large community, the population of Sarpourenx was reported as 25 households in 1385. The town was then part of the bailiwick of Larbaig.

French historian and archivist Paul Raymond (1833–1878) recorded the existence in Sarpourenx of an abbaye laïque (a small, independent parish operated for the profit of an influential local), administered by the viscounts of Béarn.

The name "Sarpourenx" is also historically attested in the variant forms "Sarporencx" (1385 Béarn census), "Sarporencxs", and "Sarporenxs" (from the 1538 and 1546 redistrictings of Béarn, respectively).

Geography
Sarpourenx is located in the historic former province of Béarn, on the left bank of the river Gave de Pau.  Its territory includes at least one small hamlet, Le Gave, and a tributary stream of the Gave de Pau, Géu Mort. Neighboring communes include Castétis (north), Argagnon (east), Biron (west), Castetner (west), Maslacq (south), and Orthez (southeast).  Via road, Sarpourenx is accessible by Departmental Route 9, near exit 8 of Autoroute A64.

Economy
Sarpourenx is part of the appellation zone for production of Ossau-Iraty, a sheep's milk cheese.

Government

On 13 February 2008, then-mayor Gérard Lalanne issued a municipal order forbidding death within the commune's jurisdiction, threatening severe punishment for offenders.  His action was a symbolic protest — Sarpourenx's small cemetery was becoming crowded, and a judge's decision had rejected the commune's request to expropriate private farmland for burial ground.  Lalanne himself died ten months later.

See also
 Communes of the Pyrénées-Atlantiques department
 Cugnaux — another French commune with an anti-death ordinance

References

External links

 http://www.sarpourenx.fr/ — Official site (in French)

Communes of Pyrénées-Atlantiques